Hydrurus foetidus is a large freshwater alga found in a cold rivers. It is a chrysophyte. As a group of planktonic organisms, the chrysophytes are better known for their colonial Chrysosphaerella or their loricate Dinobryon. Generally, freshwater chrysophytes are associated with softwater lakes, but they are also found in dilute brown water ponds.

References

Chrysophyceae